The men's 5000 metres race of the 2014–15 ISU Speed Skating World Cup 4, arranged in the Thialf arena in Heerenveen, Netherlands, was held on 13 December 2014.

Sven Kramer of the Netherlands won, followed by Jorrit Bergsma of the Netherlands in second place, and Wouter olde Heuvel of the Netherlands in third place. Viktor Hald Torup of Denmark set a new national record, and Nils van der Poel of Sweden won Division B on a new national record for juniors.

Results
The race took place on Saturday, 13 December, with Division B scheduled in the morning session, at 11:29, and Division A scheduled in the afternoon session, at 14:46.

Division A

Division B

Notes: NR = national record, NRJ = national record for juniors.

References

Men 5000
4